The .275 No 2 Magnum, also known as the 7mm Rigby Magnum Flanged and the .275 No 2 Rigby, is an obsolete centerfire rifle cartridge developed by John Rigby & Company in 1927.

Overview
The .275 No 2 Magnum is a rimmed cartridge intended for use in double rifles. Rigby introduced the .275 No 2 Magnum by necking down the .375 Flanged Nitro Express, it was still available in the early 1960s. The .275 No 2 Magnum's performance is comparable to the .275 Rigby.

In his African Rifles and Cartridges, John "Pondoro" Taylor rated the .275 No 2 Magnum as his favourite of all the small bore cartridges.

See also
List of rifle cartridges
7mm rifle cartridges

References

Footnotes

Bibliography
 Barnes, Frank C, Cartridges of the World, ed 13, Gun Digest Books, Iola, 2012, .
 Cartridgecollector, ".275 No. 2 Magnum (7mm Rigby Flanged Mag)", www.cartridgecollector.net, retrieved 16 December 2016.
 Taylor, John, African rifles and cartridges, Sportsman's Vintage Press, 2013, .

Pistol and rifle cartridges
British firearm cartridges
John Rigby & Co cartridges